Bäckefors is a locality situated in Bengtsfors Municipality, Västra Götaland County, Sweden. It had 673 inhabitants in 2010.

The Movie Kopps was filmed here in 2003.

The hospital Dalslands Sjukhus is located here.

Bäckefors was an important rail hub during the World War II, when many trains passed here with German soldiers.

References 

Populated places in Västra Götaland County
Populated places in Bengtsfors Municipality
Dalsland